Phlogacanthus is a genus of flowering plants in the family Acanthaceae and tribe Andrographideae.  Its distribution includes India through to Indo-China, southern China and Sulawesi.

Species
Plants of the World Online currently recognises more than 40 species:
 Phlogacanthus abbreviatus  (Craib) Benoist
 Phlogacanthus albiflorus  Bedd.
 Phlogacanthus annamensis  Benoist
 Phlogacanthus asperulus  Nees
 Phlogacanthus brevis  C.B.Clarke
 Phlogacanthus celebicus  Backer ex Bremek.
 Phlogacanthus colaniae  Benoist
 Phlogacanthus cornutus  Benoist
 Phlogacanthus curviflorus  (Nees) Nees
 Phlogacanthus cymosus  (T.Anderson) Kurz
 Phlogacanthus datii  (Benoist) D.V.Hai, Y.F.Deng & R.K.Choudhary
 Phlogacanthus elongatus  T.Anderson
 Phlogacanthus fuscus  Lindau
 Phlogacanthus geoffrayi  Benoist
 Phlogacanthus gomezii  (Nees) J.R.I.Wood
 Phlogacanthus gracilis  P.Anderson ex Burkill
 Phlogacanthus grandis  Bedd.
 Phlogacanthus guttatus  Nees
 Phlogacanthus insignis  Kurz
 Phlogacanthus jenkinsii  C.B.Clarke
 Phlogacanthus kjellbergii  Bremek.
 Phlogacanthus lambertii  Raizada
 Phlogacanthus magnus  (C.B.Clarke) Y.F.Deng
 Phlogacanthus murtonii  Craib
 Phlogacanthus paniculatus  (T.Anderson) J.B.Imlay
 Phlogacanthus parviflorus  T.Anderson
 Phlogacanthus pauciflorus  J.B.Imlay
 Phlogacanthus pedunculatus  J.B.Imlay
 Phlogacanthus pochinii  Raizada
 Phlogacanthus poilanei  Benoist
 Phlogacanthus prostratus  J.B.Imlay
 Phlogacanthus pubinervius  T.Anderson
 Phlogacanthus publiflorus  Lindau
 Phlogacanthus pulcherrimus  T.Anderson
 Phlogacanthus pyramidalis  Benoist
 Phlogacanthus racemosus  Bremek.
 Phlogacanthus rectiflorus  J.B.Imlay
 Phlogacanthus thyrsiformis  (Roxb. ex Hardw.) Mabb.
 Phlogacanthus tubiflorus  Nees
 Phlogacanthus turgidus  (Fua ex Hook.f.) Lindau
 Phlogacanthus vitellinus  (Roxb.) T.Anderson
 Phlogacanthus yangtsekiangensis  (H.Lév.) C.Xia & Y.F.Deng

Gallery

References

External links

Acanthaceae
Acanthaceae genera
Flora of Indo-China
Lamiales of Asia